HMS Vansittart was an Admiralty modified W-class destroyer built for the Royal Navy.  She was ordered in January 1918 from William Beardmore & Company with the 13th Order for Destroyers of the Emergency War Program of 1918–19. She was the second Royal Navy ship to carry the name which was first used in 1821 for a hired packet.

Construction
HMS Vansittarts keel was laid on 7 January 1918 at the William Beardmore & Company Shipyard at Dalmuir.  She was launched on 17 April 1919.  She was 312 feet overall in length with a beam of 29.5 feet.  Her mean draught was 9 feet, and would reach 11.25 feet under full load.  She had a displacement of 1,140 tons standard and up to 1,550 full load.

She was propelled by three Yarrow water tube boilers powering Brown-Curtis geared steam turbines developing 27,000 SHP driving two screws for a maximum designed speed of 34 knots.  She was oil-fired and had a bunkerage of 320 to 370 tons.  This gave a range of between 3500 nautical miles at 15 knots and 900 nautical miles at 32 knots.

She shipped four BL 4.7 in (120-mm) Mk.I guns, mount P Mk.I naval guns in four single centre-line turrets.  The turrets were disposed as two forward and two aft in super imposed firing positions.  She also carried two QF 2 pdr Mk.II "pom-pom" (40 mm L/39) mounted abeam between funnels.  Abaft of the second funnel, she carried six 21-inch torpedo tubes in two triple mounts on the centre-line.

Inter-War period
HMS Vansittart was commissioned on 5 November 1919 into the Royal Navy and assigned the pennant number D64.  After her acceptance trials she was assigned to the 4th Destroyer Flotilla in the Atlantic Fleet.  In 1925 the 4th Flotilla was transferred to the Mediterranean.  In early 1930s she underwent a refit and was placed in reserve as more modern destroyers came into service.  This ship was laid-up in Maintenance Reserve at Rosyth with a special complement.  She was reactivated manned by Reservists for a Royal Review at Weymouth in August 1939.  As war loomed she was brought to war readiness.

Second World War
HMS Vansittart was allocated to the 15th Destroyer Flotilla in the Western Approaches Command and deployed in the English Channel for convoy defence.  Her first deployment was to escort troops of the British Expeditionary Force (BEF) from the Solent to Brest.

In October she was transferred to the 17th Destroyer Flotilla based at Plymouth for convoy defence in the South-West Approaches.  She remained in this deployment through April when she was sent to Scapa Flow in response to the German invasion of Norway.

She was deployed in protecting military convoys until she was damaged at Narvik during an air attack on 10 May, during the Battles of Narvik.  On 20 May she deployed on Operation Ordnance – the evacuation of Dutch ports including Rotterdam and the Hook of Holland.  At the end of May her pennant number was changed to I64 for visual signalling purposes.

In June she was again deployed to the South-West approaches.  On 1 July she responded to a distress signal from the torpedoed merchant ship .  An hour after arriving on the scene she established a strong ASDIC return and made two runs dropping eleven depth charges set for 350 to 500 feet.  After this attack she was unable to re-establish contact, and observed a large oil slick.  She recovered the survivors of SS Clearton and remained on patrol until the next day, before returning to port.  Post war analysis credited her with the sinking of U-102 on 1 July.

During her career she underwent one reconstruction, to serve as a long range escort. Such maintenance was completed in June 1943.

Disposition
On 25 February 1946, HMS Vansittart was sold to be broken up for scrap.

Notes

Bibliography

External links

U boat resource

 

V and W-class destroyers of the Royal Navy
Ships built on the River Clyde
1919 ships
World War II destroyers of the United Kingdom